Anni Rehborn (25 August 1904 – 15 January 1986) was a German swimmer who won a bronze medal in the  freestyle relay at the 1927 European Aquatics Championships. She entered the 1928 Summer Olympics, but did not compete for unknown reasons. During her career she won eight national titles in the 100 m backstroke (1923–1925, 1927–1929) and 100 m freestyle events (1923–1924).

Family 
Rehborn was the wife of Karl Brandt, one of Adolf Hitler's personal physicians. The two married on 17 March 1934. The couple had one child, Karl Adolf Brandt, born 4 October 1935. With her husband a part of Hitler's inner circle, Rehborn became close friends with both Eva Braun and Margarete Speer, wife of Albert Speer.
Karl Brandt led the Action T4 euthanasia programme started by a decree from Hitler in September 1939, in which disabled patients were executed by the regime. Karl Brandt was tried for crimes against humanity at the Doctors' Trial, found guilty and executed by hanging.

Her elder brother Julius and sister Hanni were Olympic divers.

References

German female swimmers
German female freestyle swimmers
1907 births
1987 deaths
Sportspeople from Bochum
European Aquatics Championships medalists in swimming
20th-century German women